Shijia Township is a township in Fuchuan Yao Autonomous County, Guangxi, China.

Administrative division
As of 2016, the township is divided into one community and seven villages: 
 Shijia Community 
 Shijian 
 Caoli 
 Chengshang 
 Huangzhu 
 Pingzhu 
 Longwan 
 Zeyuan

History
It was incorporated as a township in 1984.

Geography
It lies at the northeastern of Fuchuan Yao Autonomous County, bordering Gepo Town to the west, Fuli Town to the south, Mailing Town and Jiangyong County to the north, and Jianghua Yao Autonomous County to the east.

The Shijia River flow the township north to south.

Economy
Agriculture and forestry also play roles in the local economy. Economic crops are mainly Navel orange, medicinal materials and tobacco. Breeding includes pig farming, goat farming, and poultry farming.

References

Bibliography

Townships of Hezhou